Chivvemla mandal is one of the 23 mandals in Suryapet district of the Indian state of Telangana. It is under the administration of Suryapet revenue division with its headquarters at Chivvemla. It is bounded by Suryapet mandal towards west, Athmakur (S) mandal towards North, Mothey mandal towards East, Penpahad mandal towards South.

Geography
It is in the 185 m elevation (altitude) .

Demographics
Chivvemla mandal is having population of 44,301 living in 9,868 Houses,  Males are 22,630 and Females are 21,671 . Vattikhammam Pahad is the largest village and Thuljaraopet is the smallest village in the mandal.

Villages
 census of India, the mandal has 15 settlements.
The settlements in the mandal are listed below:

Notes
(†) Mandal headquarter

References

Mandals in Suryapet district